The 37th (Tyne Electrical Engineers) Searchlight Regiment, Royal Artillery was an air defence unit of Britain's Territorial Army (TA) during World War II. It served in the Battle of France, when it was one of the last British units evacuated. It then served in Anti-Aircraft Command defending the UK, particularly against V-1 flying bombs.

Origin

The unit was formed in 1936, as 37th (Tyne Electrical Engineers) Anti-Aircraft Battalion, Royal Engineers, by expanding 307th (Tyne) AA Company, RE, an independent searchlight company based in Tynemouth, near Newcastle upon Tyne. 307 Company was part of the Tyne Electrical Engineers (TEE), a longstanding TA unit of the Royal Engineers (RE). During World War I the TEE had been the parent unit for almost half the anti-aircraft (AA) searchlight companies formed for service both at home and overseas. When the TA's AA organisation was established in the early 1920s, one of the TEE's companies was re-converted to the searchlight role as 307 Company in 1924. (The other independent companies were numbered 309–18: the number 308 was kept vacant in case of expansion of the TEE.)

In 1936, as part of the further expansion of AA defences, 307 AA Company was expanded into a full battalion, with the following organisation:
 HQ Company at Station Rd, Tynemouth
 307 AA Company at Tynemouth
 308 AA Company at Tynemouth
 348 AA Company at Heaton
 349 AA Company at Heaton

37th AA Battalion formed part of 30th (Northumbrian) AA Group (later Brigade) based at Sunderland, in 2 AA Division.

World War II

Mobilisation
The TA's AA units were mobilised on 23 September 1938 during the Munich Crisis, with units manning their emergency positions within 24 hours, even though many did not yet have their full complement of men or equipment. The emergency lasted three weeks, and they were stood down on 13 October.

When the TA doubled in size following the Munich Crisis, the TEE formed a duplicate unit as a Light Anti-Aircraft (LAA) regiment of the Royal Artillery (RA), designated 37th (Tyne Electrical Engineers) LAA Regiment, RA (TA), which and was still in course of formation at Tynemouth when World War II broke out in September 1939.

In February 1939 the existing AA defences came under the control of a new Anti-Aircraft Command. In June a partial mobilisation of TA units was begun in a process known as 'couverture', whereby each AA unit did a month's tour of duty in rotation to man selected AA and searchlight positions. On 24 August, ahead of the declaration of war, AA Command was fully mobilised at its war stations. 37th AA Battalion was still in 30 AA Bde, but was now part of newly formed 7 AA Division based in Newcastle.

By early 1940 the regiment was at Bordon Camp, and at the beginning of May moved to Aldershot to prepare to join the British Expeditionary Force (BEF) in France.

Battle of France
The Battle of France had already begun when 37 S/L Regiment began embarking. Regimental HQ and a composite battery comprising one troop from each battery embarked at Dover on 15 May 1940 and landed at Dunkirk the next day. They were followed by 307 Battery, but the rest of the regiment was halted on the road to Dover and returned to Aldershot. The Composite Battery and 307 Battery eventually joined RHQ, driving through streams of refugees, but because of the rapid advance of the Germans, they were withdrawn to take up positions protecting Le Havre (307 Bty with 24 lights) and Harfleur (Composite Bty with 13 lights), under 3 AA Bde while the main BEF was being evacuated from Dunkirk. On 9 June RHQ and Composite Bty moved again to St Malo, where 37 S/L RHQ took command of the heavy and light AA guns of 23 AA Battery, RA, and was joined by one troop of 307 Bty from the south side of the River Seine.

Part of 349 Bty had landed at Cherbourg – Maupertus Airport on 19 May and entrained for Le Havre, but returned to Cherbourg after a 900-mile trip round France. 348 Bty had also landed at Cherbourg, on 20 May, and proceeded to Rennes. By now Le Havre was under continuous bombing attacks, and 307 Bty provided a detachment with light machine-guns and anti-tank rifles to reinforce the land defences . On 10 June 307 Bty was ordered to wreck its equipment and was evacuated by sea to Cherbourg after the Seine ferry was destroyed.

On 17 June the batteries destroyed their remaining equipment and moved from Rennes and Cherbourg to the ports at Brest, St Malo, and St Nazaire from where the regiment was evacuated to Southampton, one of the last British units to leave France. Some of the regiment's personnel were aboard the Lancastria when she was sunk off St Nazaire, but all except two were rescued.

Home defence
The evacuated parts of 37th S/L Regiment were concentrated at Norton Manor Camp, near Taunton, where 307 Bty re-equipped from the part of 349 Bty that had not gone overseas (349 Bty personnel were operating No 8 Reception Camp for men returning from Dunkirk). These lights were deployed round Stroud by 29 June, coming under the control of 46th AA Brigade.

In July 1940, a new 5th AA Brigade was formed at Gloucester to which 37 S/L Regiment was subordinated. This formed part of 5th AA Division but in the autumn was transferred to a new 9th AA Division responsible for the AA defence of South Wales and the Severn Valley.

In common with other AA units of the RE, 37th AA Battalion was transferred to the Royal Artillery on 1 August 1940, becoming 37th (TEE) Searchlight Regiment, RA. The AA Companies were designated Searchlight Batteries, and the men's ranks changed from 'Sapper' and 'Corporal' to 'Gunner' and 'Bombardier'.

During the winter of 1940–41, at the height of The Blitz, 37 S/L Regiment was headquartered at Tewkesbury with its detachments in the surrounding area. Enemy air activity was reported as 'slight' and 'small scale', and was mainly over Birmingham, with one raid on Cheltenham on 11 December. RHQ remained at Tewkesbury until September 1942 (with the exception of training camps at Rhyl and Briton Ferry in August–September 1941), with the batteries deployed as follows:
 307 Bty at Llandaff (operating the 'Cardiff–Newport Dazzle Area')
 308 Bty at Clanna
 348 Bty at Hereford
 349 Bty at Stonehouse, Gloucestershire (provided homing beacons for aircraft returning to RAF Colerne and RAF Moreton-in-Marsh)

On 27 July 1942 the lights of 37 Regiment were engaged during a raid on Cheltenham (part of the 'Baedeker Blitz').

In the autumn of 1942 AA Command was redeployed and reorganised. In September, 37 S/L Regiment redeployed as follows:
 RHQ and Training Bty to Llandaff (relieving 67 S/L Regiment)
 307 Bty to Blackwood, Caerphilly
 308 Bty to Alvington, Gloucestershire, then to Blackwood in October
 348 Bty to Bridgend
 349 Bty at Stonehouse

The AA Divisions were scrapped in November, being replaced by AA Groups that mirrored the organisation of RAF Fighter Command. By the end of 1942, 37 S/L Regiment was part of 69th AA Brigade in 3 AA Group, supporting No. 10 Group RAF.

37 S/L Regiment remained in position during 1943 into the early part of 1944. Air raids were becoming uncommon, and with the lower threat of attack by the weakened Luftwaffe, AA Command was being forced to release manpower for Overlord, and all Home Defence searchlight regiments were reduced by a battery. 349 Battery commenced disbandment on 25 February 1944, completing by 24 March. However, E Troop of 504 Bty of 79th S/L Rgt and E/459 Trp of 70th (Sussex) S/L Rgt both joined on 3 March, becoming E/307 and E/348 Trps respectively

Operation Diver
In May 1944 the regiment was transferred to Lambourne in Essex. From June there were frequent alerts for 'Divers', the codename for V-1 flying bombs. Troops of 37 S/L Regiment were deployed to the Essex and Suffolk coast to support the brigades of AA guns engaging the V-1s. In January 1945, 307 Bty took over a line of 28 radar-controlled searchlights covering Clacton to Lowestoft from 314 Independent S/L Battery. On 3 March, the guns brought down no fewer than eight 'Divers' engaged by 307 Bty. Later that month the regiment redeployed in Norfolk under 56th AA Brigade:
 RHQ at Norwich
 307 Bty at South Raynham
 308 Bty at Guist
 348 Bty at Aylsham

'Diver' alerts continued until the end of March 1945. After VE Day the regiment moved to Widnes, but 308 Bty remained in Norfolk conducting War Office trials.

Postwar
When the TA was reconstituted on 1 January 1947, 37th (TEE) S/L Rgt with its three remaining batteries (307, 308, 348) was placed in suspended animation at the Militia Camp, Royston, Hertfordshire. The war-raised personnel then reformed the regiment and batteries in the Regular Army with the same numbers. On 1 April, this regiment was redesignated 119th S/L Regiment with 307, 308 and 348 S/L Btys. However, it was disbanded a month later.

Meanwhile, a number of TA units were reformed in 1947 that traced their origin to the Tyne Electrical Engineers' lineage. These included RE units and 537 Searchlight Regiment (Tyne Electrical Engineers) representing the RA heritage of 37th S/L Regiment and 37th LAA Regiment.

Insignia
During World War II, 37 S/L Regiment wore a regimental arm flash of a stylised lighthouse with one beam pointing upwards, embroidered in yellow with a black edging.

Notes

References
 Keith Brigstock Royal Artillery Searchlights, presentation to Royal Artillery Historical Society at Larkhill, 17 January 2007 (cached at Google).
 Gen Sir Martin Farndale, History of the Royal Regiment of Artillery: The Years of Defeat: Europe and North Africa, 1939–1941, Woolwich: Royal Artillery Institution, 1988/London: Brasseys, 1996, .
 J.B.M. Frederick, Lineage Book of British Land Forces 1660–1978, Vol II, Wakefield: Microform Academic, 1984, .
 Norman E.H. Litchfield, The Territorial Artillery 1908–1988 (Their Lineage, Uniforms and Badges), Nottingham: Sherwood Press, 1992, .
 Brig N.W. Routledge, History of the Royal Regiment of Artillery: Anti-Aircraft Artillery 1914–55, London: Royal Artillery Institution/Brassey's, 1994, 
 Maj O.M. Short, Maj H. Sherlock, Capt L.E.C.M. Perowne and Lt M.A. Fraser, The History of the Tyne Electrical Engineers, Royal Engineers, 1884–1933, 1933/Uckfield: Naval & Military, nd, .
 Graham E. Watson & Richard A. Rinaldi, The Corps of Royal Engineers: Organization and Units 1889–2018, Tiger Lily Books, 2018, .

External sources
 British Army units from 1945 on
 British Military History
 Orders of Battle at Patriot Files
 Land Forces of Britain, the Empire and Commonwealth (Regiments.org)
 The Royal Artillery 1939–45
 Graham Watson, The Territorial Army 1947

Searchlight regiments of the Royal Artillery
Military units and formations established in 1940
Military units and formations in Northumberland
Military units and formations in Newcastle upon Tyne
Military history of Tynemouth